Erwin Potts (April 20, 1932 – May 18, 2017) was the first non-McClatchy family member CEO of the McClatchy Company from 1989 to 1996.

Potts was born in Pineville, North Carolina, attended Mars Hill College and is a graduate of the University of North Carolina.

Between 1958 and 1970, he was a reporter, city editor and assistant manager at the Miami Herald. He was general manager of the Tallahassee Democrat, The Charlotte Observer and The Charlotte News.

In 1989 he became president of McClatchy and in 1996 became CEO. He was chairman when he retired in 2001. Potts died due to complications from an accident sustained at his home in Cabo San Lucas, Mexico on May 18, 2017.

References

1932 births
2017 deaths
Mars Hill University alumni
University of North Carolina at Chapel Hill alumni
McClatchy people
People from Pineville, North Carolina
People from Cabo San Lucas